Siparia is a parliamentary electoral district in Trinidad and Tobago in the south of Trinidad. It has been represented since 1995 by Kamla Persad-Bissessar of the United National Congress.

Constituency profile 
The constituency was created prior to the 1961 general election. It borders the constituencies of Moruga/Tableland, La Brea, Oropouche East, Oropouche West, Naparima and Fyzabad. The main towns are Siparia, Penal, Sadhoowa, Mendez, and Morne Diablo. It had an electorate of 27,920 as of 2015.

Members of Parliament 
This constituency has elected the following members of the House of Representatives of Trinidad and Tobago:

Election results

Elections in the 2020s

Elections in the 2010s

References 

Constituencies of the Parliament of Trinidad and Tobago